Mark Bradshaw (born 7 September 1969) is an English former professional footballer and manager.

References

External links
Curzon Ashton Ladies profile of Mark Bradshaw

1969 births
Living people
Footballers from Ashton-under-Lyne
English footballers
Association football defenders
Blackpool F.C. players
York City F.C. players
Stafford Rangers F.C. players
Macclesfield Town F.C. players
Halifax Town A.F.C. players
Droylsden F.C. players
Mossley A.F.C. players
Stockport Sports F.C. players
Curzon Ashton F.C. players
English Football League players
English football managers
England semi-pro international footballers